The Albanian Commander of the Naval Force is the leader of the country's navy. The Commander of the Naval Force is appointed by the President of Albania and serves under the Minister of Defence.

The current commander, Major General Ylber Dogjani, was appointed on 13 October 2015.  General Dogjani previously served as director of Albania's Military Intelligence Service, the SHIU.

Commanders of the Naval Force

Albanian Kingdom

People's Socialist Republic of Albania

Republic of Albania

Notes

References

External links 
Official Website of the Albanian Naval Force

Military of Albania
Albania